Matías García may refer to:

 Matías García (footballer, born 1980), Argentine football midfielder for Deportivo Maipú
 Matías García (footballer, born 1991), Argentine football midfielder for San Martín de Tucumán
 Matías García (footballer, born 1995), Argentine football midfielder for Unión de Santa Fe
 Matías García (footballer, born 1996), Maltese football defensive midfielder for Floriana